Tiffany Montgomery (born November 21, 1982), known professionally as Ryan Starr, is a singer who finished seventh on the first season of American Idol. She went on to release a successful single on iTunes and participated in a handful of other television programs, modeling campaigns, and worldwide music tours.

Early life
Ryan Starr was born Tiffany Montgomery in the Sunland neighborhood of Los Angeles, California, a place where she once described as a "middle of nowhere town, up in the hills - like, horse country." Her elementary, middle, and high schools were all about "a block from one another" in her words, and growing up, Starr considered herself to be "a small-town tomboy". She has three sisters. On her mother's side, she is Peruvian and Bolivian. She also has French and Irish ancestry.

Although Starr was named Homecoming Queen, she reminisced in a 2017 blog post that she was "dorky" and "definitely not one of the popular kids" for most of her time in school. She graduated from Verdugo Hills High School in 2000, where she ran track. Before attempting a music career, she worked as a waitress, lifeguard, swim team coach, and at a clothing store.

Around the age of seven, Starr began learning how to sing. Her family was unable to afford formal vocal training, so as a child, Starr developed her voice by singing along to Disney films. Drawn to jazz and blues artists from a young age, Nat King Cole, Ella Fitzgerald, Billie Holiday, Etta James, Janis Joplin, and Otis Redding were among Starr's first musical influences. As Starr got older, she found inspiration in rock musicians, such as Pat Benatar, Chris Cornell, Steve Perry, and Steven Tyler.

Career

American Idol
After graduating from high school, Starr went on frequent bus excursions into Hollywood from her nearby hometown, and on one of these, she met a girl who suggested that the two of them audition for American Idol first season together. Starr's performance of "Lean on Me" (by Bill Withers) was the first successful audition ever shown on the series. In his 2003 autobiography, I Don't Mean to Be Rude, But..., Simon Cowell wrote that Starr was "cripplingly shy" at the audition, but that Paula Abdul "saw some potential for stardom in her, and decided to mentor her."

Starr, who auditioned as Tiffany Montgomery, adopted her stage name by Hollywood Week. Placed into Group 1 for the Top 30 semi-finals, her song choice for that round of an old jazz standard, "The Frim-Fram Sauce", puzzled Cowell and Randy Jackson, although the following night Cowell deemed Starr "a dark horse" and predicted that she could excel in the competition with better singing material. After she was voted through to the Top 10, Starr opened the first round of the finals, singing  "If You Really Love Me" by Stevie Wonder; this marked the first live performance in the history of American Idol. Starr was well-received by the judges for that performance but was voted off the series two weeks later in seventh place.

The second of Starr's live performances, "You Really Got Me" by The Kinks, was panned by the judges and resulted in a Bottom 2 placement for that week. While Starr's final performance of the competition, "Last Dance" by Donna Summer, was praised by the judges as an improvement over the previous week, it prompted Cowell to reflect on Starr's disparate song choices throughout the competition and express confusion over what kind of artist Starr wanted to be. The judges felt that Starr struggled with aspects of her performances throughout every round of the finals but communicated a shared belief in Starr's potential. Upon Starr's elimination from the competition, Cowell gave Starr an offer to call him anytime for help with pursuing a music career.

Performances

"These Boots Are Made for Walkin'" Nancy Sinatra, (solo part in Group performance)

Post-American Idol music career
Starr blamed her stalled music career on a two-year restrictive recording contract with RCA. Under this contract, she refused to record an album claiming producers wanted to turn her into an Avril Lavigne type singer. After an intense three year legal battle she was released from contract in 2005.

Upon release from her contract, Starr went on to host "TRL" on "VH1". Starr then released an iTunes Exclusive Single, "My Religion." The song went all the way to number one on the US Billboard Hot Digital Songs Chart, and was noted in the 2005 edition of the Guinness Book of World Records to have sold the most exclusive single downloads in iTunes's history. They also went on to detail the fact that My Religion was slated to be released to stores in early 2006, however, iTunes refused to release Ryan Starr's single from contract. One of the highest selling exclusive singles ever, it sold an estimated 360,000 units worldwide according to MTV and USA Today.

In an interview given to the Today Show in early 2007, Starr revealed that iTunes had expressed interest in Starr releasing another exclusive single to follow up the immense success of "My Religion." Starr claimed that she was reluctant to accept as she wished to release a full album, but hinted she had accepted the very lucrative offer put forth by iTunes. Rumors began to circulate that 'Stranded' would be the next exclusive single when images of a single cover were released on her MySpace.

Television appearances

Filmography

Commercials

Discography

Singles

Compilation appearances

As featured artist

Other songs

References

External links
 

1982 births
Living people
21st-century American singers
21st-century American women singers
21st-century American actresses
American Idol participants
American pop rock singers
American women pop singers
American women rock singers
American women singer-songwriters
American film actresses
American rock songwriters
American television actresses
Actresses from Los Angeles
Singers from Los Angeles
Singer-songwriters from California